Arhopala caeca is a species of butterfly of the family Lycaenidae. It is found on Borneo, Sumatra and Peninsular Malaysia.

References

Butterflies described in 1863
Arhopala
Butterflies of Borneo
Butterflies of Indonesia
Butterflies of Malaysia
Taxa named by William Chapman Hewitson